Lora, Su Lira y Sus Rolas (Lora, His Guitar And His Songs) (1999) is the fifteenth studio album by Mexican rock and blues singer Alex Lora and the first one solo, as a separate project of his band El Tri. The main single is Lora's signature song "Triste Canción" in a slower tempo and with a trio

Reception
The AllMusic review by Heather Phares awarded the album 4 stars stating "Alex Lora's Lora, Su Lira Y Sus Rolas is the solo debut from El Tri's singer/songwriter. Over the album's 13 songs, Lora demonstrates the singing and playing skills that helped make El Tri one of the most important Latin rock acts. Tracks like "Palabras," "Que Gueva" and "Triste Cancion" are among Lora, Su Lira Y Sus Rolas' most memorable moments.".

Track listing 
All tracks by Alex Lora except where noted.

 "Palabras" (Words) – 2:38 
 "Dos de Bastos" (Two of Clubs) – 2:41 
 "Canción de Cuna" (Lullaby) – 2:57
 "Nuestros Impuestos" (Our Taxes) – 2:59 
 "Murmullo de Amor" (Love Whisper) – 3:39
 "La Primera Piedra" (The First Stone) – 2:40
 "Que Güeva" (Laziness) – 2:34
 "El Mamey y el Ñero" (Lora, Horacio Reni) – 2:07
 "La Bolsa" (The Stock Exchange) – 3:11
 "Ya No le Metas" (Give The Thing a Rest) – 2:17
 "Beto" – 4:22
 "Ya Estamos Hartos" (We Had It) – 3:43
 "Triste Canción" (Sad Song) – 3:25

Personnel 
 Alex Lora – guitar, vocals, producer, mixing
 Rafael Salgado – harmonic

Guest musicians 
 In "Triste Canción"
 Bernardino Maldonado – maracas, lead vocals
 Daniel Torres – backing vocals, harmony
 Alejandro Domínguez – requinto

Technical 
 Chela Lora – concept
 Fernando Aceves – photography
 Jean B. Smith – engineer, mixing
 Mark Chaleki – mastering
 Juan Carlos Paz y Puente – A&R
 Maricela Valencia – coordination

References

External links
www.eltri.com.mx
Lora, Su Lira y Sus Rolas at MusicBrainz
[ Lora, Su Lira y Sus Rolas] at AllMusic

El Tri albums
1999 albums
Warner Music Group albums